Ibrahim Qadirzada (born on 21 March 1999) is an Azerbaijani football midfielder.

Club career
On 6 December 2015, Qadirzada made his debut in the Azerbaijan Premier League for Khazar Lankaran match against Gabala.

References

External links
 

1999 births
Living people
Association football defenders
Azerbaijani footballers
Azerbaijan Premier League players
Khazar Lankaran FK players
Erovnuli Liga players
FC Samtredia players
Qarabağ FK players
Expatriate footballers in Georgia (country)
Azerbaijani expatriate footballers
Azerbaijani expatriate sportspeople in Georgia (country)